Principia Cybernetica is an international cooperation of scientists in the field of cybernetics and systems science, especially known for their website, Principia Cybernetica. They have dedicated their organization to what they call "a computer-supported evolutionary-systemic philosophy, in the context of the transdisciplinary academic fields of Systems Science and Cybernetics".

Organisation 
Principia Cybernetica was initiated in 1989 in the USA by Cliff Joslyn and Valentin Turchin, and a year later broadened to Europe with Francis Heylighen from Belgium joining their cooperation.

Major activities of the Principia Cybernetica Project are: 
 Principia Cybernetica Web: an online encyclopedia
 Web Dictionary of Cybernetics and Systems; an online dictionary
 Newsletter Principia Cybernetica News
 Conferences and traditional publications

The organization is associated with: 
 American Society for Cybernetics.
 Evolution, Complexity and Cognition group: a transdisciplinary research group at the Free University of Brussels, Belgium, founded in 2004 and directed by Francis Heylighen.
 Journal of Memetics-Evolutionary Models of Information Transmission (JoM-EMIT) is an international peer-refereed scientific journal
 Global Brain Group: for discussion about the emergence of a global brain.

Principia Cybernetica Web 
The Principia Cybernetica Web, which went online in 1993, is one of the first complex webs in the world.
It is still viewed as one of the most important sites on cybernetics, systems theory, complexity, and related approaches.

Workshops and symposia 
Especially in the 1990s the Principia Cybernetica has organized a series of workshops and international symposia on cybernetic themes. On the 1st Principia Cybernetica Workshop in June 1991 in Brussels many cyberneticists attended like Harry Bronitz, Gordon Pask, J.L. Elohim, Robert Glueck, Ranulph Glanville, Annemie Van Kerkhoven, Don McNeil, Elan Moritz, Cliff Joslyn, A. Comhaire and Valentin Turchin.

See also 
 W. Ross Ashby
 Complex adaptive system
 Evolutionary epistemology
 Global brain
 Manifest and latent functions and dysfunctions
 Red Queen
 Stuart Umpleby
 Emergence

References

Further reading 
 Woody Evans (2003), A Review of the Principia Cybernetica Web, Mississippi Libraries, 67(1), p.16, Spring 2003.
 Ben Goertzel (2000), The Principia Cybernetica Project: Placing the Web at the Center of Man’s Quest for Knowledge, September 2000.
 Koen Van Damme (2007), Principia Cybernetica: An introduction.
 Francis Heylighen (2000). "Foundations and Methodology for an Evolutionary World View: A Review of the Principia Cybernetica Project" in: Foundations of Science, 5(4), p.457-490.
 Francis Heylighen, C. Joslyn & Valentin Turchin (1991). "A Short Introduction to the Principia Cybernetica Project". in: Journal of Ideas, 2(1), p.26-29.
 C. Joslyn, Francis Heylighen & V. Turchin (1993). "Synopsys of the Principia Cybernetica Project". in: Proc. 13th Int. Congress on Cybernetics, p. 509-513.

External links 
 Principia Cybernetica Home page
 Principia Cybernetica Project Organization

Cybernetics
Organizations established in 1989
Systems sciences organizations